St Columba's Church, Edinburgh may refer to:

 St Columba's-by-the-Castle, an Episcopal church in the Old Town
 St Columba's Catholic Church, Edinburgh, a Roman Catholic church in Newington
 St Columba's Gaelic Church, a former Scottish Gaelic-speaking of the Church of Scotland in Tollcross

See also
 St. Columba's Church (disambiguation)